East Livingston and East Calder is one of the nine wards used to elect members of the West Lothian Council. It elects four Councillors.

Councillors

Upcoming Elections

2021 By-Election 
Following the death of Labour Councillor and Depute Provost Dave King a by-election was called and is due to take place on August 5, 2021.

Election Results

2022 Election
2022 West Lothian Council election

2017 Election
2017 West Lothian Council election

2012 Election
2012 West Lothian Council election

2007 Election
2007 West Lothian Council election

References

Wards of West Lothian
Livingston, West Lothian